Sorina Teodorovic (née Lefter; born 21 July 1970) is an Austrian handball player. She competed in the women's tournament at the 2000 Summer Olympics.

References

1970 births
Living people
Austrian female handball players
Olympic handball players of Austria
Handball players at the 2000 Summer Olympics
Sportspeople from Bucharest